Rideau is a station on the O-Train Confederation Line on Rideau Street on the border of the Sandy Hill and ByWard Market neighbourhoods in Central Ottawa, Ontario, Canada.

Location

The underground station is beneath Rideau Street in Central Ottawa.

Originally, Rideau station was to be built under the Rideau Canal, with a station at Confederation Square, closer to Parliament Hill. It was decided to relocate the station to the east in partnership with Cadillac Fairview, the owners of the Rideau Centre, where it would serve more people and provide access to the ByWard Market.

There are two entrances from the Rideau Centre on the south side and another built into a Scotiabank on the north side of Rideau Street, at the threshold of the ByWard Market.

Through the Rideau Centre, riders can walk to Hudson's Bay, the Westin Hotel, the Shaw Centre, the Transportation Building and the National Defence Headquarters without stepping outside.

The station serves destinations such as the ByWard Market, National Gallery, US Embassy, Shaw Centre, Government Conference Centre, Rideau Canal, National War Memorial, Château Laurier and National Arts Centre, as well as retail shops, restaurants and hotels.

Layout

Rideau is an underground side platform station. Two concourses located above the two ends of the platforms contain the ticket barriers and give access to the Rideau Centre (west concourse) and the William Street/ByWard Market exit (east concourse). Both concourses feature elevators to the surface and the platforms. 

The station is the deepest on Ottawa's network, with the platform 26.5 metres underground. It also has the longest transit escalator in Canada at 35.3 metres.

The station features two artworks: FLOW/FLOTS by Geneviève Cadieux, a set of two glass screens on the station concourses overlooking the platforms; and The shape this takes to get to that by Jim Verburg, a set of murals in the access stairwells. Additionally, an exhibition area called "Corridor 45|75" is located along the corridor connecting the west concourse with the access to the Rideau Centre.

Service

The following routes serve Rideau station as of December 20 2020:
Route 12 is temporarily truncated west of St. Laurent Boulevard due to the Montreal Road revitalization project.

Sinkhole 

A sinkhole unexpectedly appeared on June 8, 2016 on Rideau Street  adjoining the excavation for the underground station.

References

External links
Confederation Line: Overview of Rideau station

Confederation Line stations
Railway stations located underground in Canada
Railway stations in Canada opened in 2019
2019 establishments in Ontario